The Orange Hoo–Hoos were a minor league baseball team based in Orange, Texas. In 1907 and 1908, the Hoo–Hoos played as members of the Class D level Gulf Coast League, before the league folded during the 1908 season. Orange hosted minor league home games at Orange City Park.

History
Minor League baseball began in Orange in 1907, when the "Hoo–Hoos" became charter members of the six–team, Class D level Gulf Coast League. The Alexandria White Sox, Lafayette Browns, Lake Charles Creoles, Monroe Municipals and Opelousas Indians, joined Orange in beginning play on April 24, 1907.

The "Hoo–Hoos" nickname corresponds to the local lumber industry, as Orange was home to seventeen saw mills at its height of lumber production. The Concatenated Order of Hoo-Hoo is a fraternal organization, established in 1892. The organization is the oldest industrial fraternal organization in the United States and consists of lumbermen and those in trades that are related to the lumber industry.

In their first season of play, the Orange Hoo–Hoos placed 4th in the Gulf Coast League standings. With a record of 50–65, playing under manager Roland Vitter, the Hoo–Hoos finished 14.5 games behind the 1st place Lake Charles Creoles in the final Gulf Coast League standings, as no playoffs were held. Orange Hoo–Hoos pitcher Dick Richardson led the league with a 9–1 record.

In 1908, Orange played their final season, as the six–team Gulf Coast League folded during the season. The Hoo–Hoos joined the returning Alexandria White Sox and Lake Charles Creoles, along with the new Beaumont Cubs, Crowley Rice Birds and Morgan City Oyster Shuckers teams in beginning league play on April 30, 1908.

On June 3, 1908, the Gulf Coast League folded, as both the Beaumont and Crowley franchises disbanded. At the time the league folded, Orange was in 2nd place with a record of 15–16. Managed by W.C. Rucker, the Hoo–Hoos finished 5.0 games behind the 1st place Lake Charles Creoles in the final standings.

Orange, Texas has not hosted another minor league team.

The ballpark
The Orange Hoo–Hoos teams played home minor league games at City Park. Today, the ballpark site is still in use as a public park, known as Orange Lions City Park.

In 1920 and 1921, the St. Louis Cardinals held their spring training in Orange, Texas at the newly constructed West End Park, next to Orange High School. Local lumber baron William Henry Stark aided in the construction of the ballpark and forming an organization to attract a team to Orange. Baseball Hall of Fame member Branch Rickey was the Cardinals' General Manager and chose Orange, Texas to host the Cardinals.

Timeline

Year–by–year records

Notable alumni
No players on the Orange Hoo–Hoos rosters advanced to the major leagues.

References

External links
Orange - Baseball Reference

Defunct minor league baseball teams
Defunct Florida Complex League teams
Baseball teams disestablished in 1908
Baseball teams established in 1907
Defunct baseball teams in Texas